Lipová is a municipality and village in Děčín District in the Ústí nad Labem Region of the Czech Republic. It has about 600 inhabitants.

Administrative parts
The village of Liščí is an administrative part of Lipová.

Geography
It lies in the salient region of Šluknov Hook, on the border with Germany. It borders the German municipalities of Steinigtwolmsdorf and Sohland an der Spree. It is situated in the Lusatian Highlands. The Liščí Brook springs here and flows across the municipality. The village of Lipová lies on the shore of the Zámecký Pond, the second notable pond in the territory is Solandský.

History
The first written mention of Lipová is from 1344, when the village was owned by the Berka of Dubá family as part of the Tolštejn estate.

Economy
The municipality suffers from its location in Šluknov Hook at the periphery of the Czech Republic. The region has persistently high unemployment rate, low supply of services and poor quality of healthcare.

Sights
The main landmark is the Church of Saints Simon and Jude, built in the Baroque style in 1691–1695. The tower was added in 1781.

Lipová Castle was built in 1736–1738. Today it is a ruin. It is surrounded by a park.

References

External links

Villages in Děčín District